Third phase is the term for a stable emulsion which forms in a liquid–liquid extraction when the original two phases (aqueous and organic) are mixed.

The third phase can be caused by a detergent (surfactant) or a fine solid. While third phase is a term for an unwanted emulsion, a stable emulsion is wanted in emulsion polymerization all the things which can be used to make a stable 'emulsion' for a latex synthesis can prove to encourage a third phase to form.

One term for the third phase found in PUREX plants is crud (Chalk River Unknown Deposit). One common crud is formed by the reaction of zirconium salts (from fission) with degraded tributyl phosphate (TBP). The TBP degrades into dibutyl hydrogen phosphate and then into butyl dihydrogen phosphate. The dibutyl hydrogen phosphate and the zirconium can form polymeric solid which is very insoluble.

References

Colloidal chemistry